Cassie Gannis (born April 7, 1991) is an American professional stock car racing driver.

Racing career
Gannis started racing in quarter midgets in 1999; from 1999–2003, she recorded 15 top fives in 18 races. In 2005, she started Legends car racing, and two years later, began racing super late models. At Tucson Raceway Park, she was the youngest female driver to race at the track.

From 2009–2011, Gannis was named a member of NASCAR's Drive for Diversity program. In 2010, she ran a USAR Pro Cup Series race at Langley Speedway, suffering mechanical problems and failing to complete a lap. A year later, she started racing in the K&N Pro Series West for Greg Rayl, recording a best finish of 16th at Colorado National Speedway and Spokane County Raceway. The following year, she raced for Rayl, Nancy Cano and John Gomez, with her best finish being 15th at Havasu 95 Speedway. She eventually won the series' Most Popular Driver Award.

In 2013, Gannis auditioned for a spot in the PEAK Stock Car Dream Challenge, a contest with the prize being a ride with Michael Waltrip Racing, and was named a finalist.

In 2015, Gannis tested for Carter 2 Motorsports in the ARCA Racing Series at Daytona International Speedway, and eventually joined the team to make her series debut at the season-opening Lucas Oil 200. Despite being 33rd fastest in a field of 49 drivers, she failed to qualify for the race. On November 6, Gannis announced that she would make her Camping World Truck Series debut in the Lucas Oil 150 at Phoenix International Raceway for Mike Harmon Racing, but once again, she failed to qualify.

In 2019, Gannis attempted to qualify for a women's-only Formula 3 series, but failed to progress beyond the evaluation day.

Personal life
Gannis works as a veterinarian technician at a Phoenix-based animal hospital. A spokesman for the Boys & Girls Clubs of Arizona, she is a speaker on teen driving safety; she also works as a host for HopeKids of AZ and a member of the Cystic Fibrosis Foundation's Arizona branch board. She often visits military bases, being awarded the Safety Chesty Award Certificate of Commendation. Asides from racing, she works as a ride-along driver for the Rusty Wallace Racing Experience. Her sister played college basketball at the University of Portland and is a firefighter for the City of Phoenix.

Motorsports career results

NASCAR
(key) (Bold – Pole position awarded by qualifying time. Italics – Pole position earned by points standings or practice time. * – Most laps led.)

Camping World Truck Series

K&N Pro Series West

ARCA Racing Series
(key) (Bold – Pole position awarded by qualifying time. Italics – Pole position earned by points standings or practice time. * – Most laps led.)

 Season still in progress
 Ineligible for series points

References

External links
 
 

Living people
1991 births
NASCAR drivers
Racing drivers from Phoenix, Arizona